Oreocossus ungemachi is a species of moth of the family Cossidae. It is found in Ethiopia.

References

Endemic fauna of Ethiopia
Moths described in 1977
Zeuzerinae